The 1979 NCAA Division II Lacrosse Championship was the sixth annual single-elimination tournament to determine the national champions of NCAA Division II and Division III men's college lacrosse in the United States.

This was the final championship before the introduction of a separate Division III men's championship in 1980. As such, this was the final year of the tournament's twelve-team format. 

The final was played at Motamed Field at Adelphi University in Garden City, New York. 

Adelphi defeated UMBC in the final, 17–12, to win their first national title. The Panthers (13–3) were coached by Paul Doherty.

This was the first Division II championship game without Hobart, who lost to St. Lawrence in the quarterfinals. The defending champions, Roanoke, also fell in the quarterfinal round.

Bracket

See also
NCAA Division I Men's Lacrosse Championship
NCAA Division III Men's Lacrosse Championship (from 1980)
NCAA Division II Women's Lacrosse Championship (from 2001)

References

NCAA Division II Men's Lacrosse Championship
NCAA Division II Men's Lacrosse Championship
NCAA Division II Men's Lacrosse